Local Route 37 Namwon–Geochang Line is a local route of South Korea that connecting Namwon , South Jeolla Province to Geochang County, South Gyeongsang Province.

History
This route was established on 25 August 2001.

Stopovers
 South Jeolla Province
 Namwon 
 South Gyeongsang Province
 Hamyang County - Geochang County

Major intersections 

 (■): Motorway
IS: Intersection, IC: Interchange

South Jeolla Province

South Gyeongsang Province

See also 
 Roads and expressways in South Korea
 Transportation in South Korea

References

External links 
 MOLIT South Korean Government Transport Department

37
Roads in South Jeolla
Roads in South Gyeongsang